Starfleet Wars, a space battle game by Superior Models, Inc. featuring five races: Terrans, Entomalians, Avarians, Aquarians and Carnivorans. It was sold to Gamemasters in 1997, and then was off the market until Monday Knight Productions re-introduced it. Introduced in 1978 and designed by Wayne Smith and Ron Spicer, Starfleet Wars was a dice-rolling simultaneous-action spaceship war game with miniature lead figures.

The Opposing Forces  
There are five different races, each with their own unique fleets of starships. 
 Terran Transolar Federation Navy (TTFN) was crewed by the human race
 Entomolian Imperial Fleet (EIF) was made up of insects
 Carnivorian Republic Star Forces (CRSF) were the race of big cats
 Aquarian Alliance Stellar Forces (AASF) came from the seas, such as fish and sharks
 Avarian United Worlds Navy (AUWN) flew in from the air as different types of birds

Miniatures 
Lead figure miniatures of each ship in the five different fleets are available to supplement game play. These were made in 1:9600 scale with some latitude built in for the small fighters that would otherwise be to small to model.

Current  
Starfleet Wars was purchased by Monday Knight Productions, and re-released under the name Galactic Knights to avoid confusion with the Star Trek franchise.

Reception
Nick Schuessler reviewed Starfleet Wars in The Space Gamer No. 31. Schuessler commented that "If you can afford the beautiful miniatures, you'll need some rules for play. Starfleet Wars can get you started, after you've done a bit of tinkering. Better still would be to wait for Superior to issue a revised edition."

See also 
 A Site Devoted Solely to the Universe of Starfleet Wars
 Latest Information on Galactic Knights from Star Ranger's Starship Combat News
 Starfleet Wars from the Wayback Machine
 Belle Haven Pewter Starfleet Wars Collections from Armik's Fine Collectibles
  Galactic Knights Rules, Accessories, and Space Fleets from The Panzer Depot
 Galactic Knights Rules and Miniatures from Noble Knight Games
 Index of Superior Models Starfleet Wars Spaceships
 Miniature figure (gaming)
 Miniature wargaming
 List of board wargames
 1978 in games

References 

Miniature wargames
Wargames introduced in 1978